Penicillium sinaicum is a species of fungus in the genus Penicillium which was isolated from marine sludge near Port Said City in Sinai Peninsula in Egypt.

References

sinaicum
Fungi described in 1982